Oleksandr Mihunov (born 13 April 1994) is a Ukrainian football midfielder who plays for Skoruk Tomakivka.

Career
Mihunov is a product of FC Dnipro youth sportive school system. In 2011, he was promoted to the FC Dnipro Dnipropetrovsk Reserves Team. He made his debut for FC Dnipro in the match against FC Olimpik Donetsk on 22 September 2014 in the Ukrainian Premier League.

In July 2015 he signed a contract with another Ukrainian Premier League club Shakhtar Donetsk and went on loan for one year to FC Illichivets Mariupol in the Ukrainian First League.

On 2 July 2021, Russian Football Union decided to relegate Chayka Peschanokopskoye from second-tier FNL back to the third-tier PFL for the 2021–22 season for fixing games in the 2018–19 season. As foreign players are not allowed to play in the PFL, that meant a release from his contract with Chayka.

In February 2023 he signed for Skoruk Tomakivka.

References

External links 

1994 births
Living people
Footballers from Donetsk
Ukrainian footballers
Association football midfielders
Ukrainian expatriate footballers
Ukrainian expatriate sportspeople in Kazakhstan
Ukrainian expatriate sportspeople in Belarus
Ukrainian expatriate sportspeople in Russia
Expatriate footballers in Kazakhstan
Expatriate footballers in Belarus
Expatriate footballers in Russia
Ukrainian Premier League players
Russian First League players
FC Dnipro players
FC Mariupol players
FC Shakhtar Donetsk players
FC Olimpik Donetsk players
SC Dnipro-1 players
FC Kolos Kovalivka players
FC Shakhter Karagandy players
FC Rukh Brest players
FC Chayka Peschanokopskoye players
FC LNZ Cherkasy players
FC Skoruk Tomakivka players